Don Sergio is a guitarist from Sparta, Tennessee who played with the American rock group, The Features, from 1993 through 1998.

Biography
Sergio joined with Matt Pelham and Roger Dabbs to form The Features while the three went to middle school together. He also was responsible for bringing keyboardist Parrish Yaw on board. Sergio stayed with the band until 1998, when he and Jason Taylor broke off from the group after their split with Spongebath Records.

Following the breakup, Sergio joined a pickup band called The Preservatives with some other musicians from the Murfreesboro area.

In 2010, Don co-founded Calfkiller Brewing Company with his brother Dave in Sparta, Tennessee.

External links
Green Rode Shotgun's official website
The Preservatives MySpace page

American rock guitarists
American male guitarists
American rock musicians
People from Sparta, Tennessee
Living people
Year of birth missing (living people)